The 2012 Cash Converters World Cup of Darts was the second edition of the PDC World Cup of Darts which took place between 3–5 February 2012 at the Alsterdorfer Sporthalle in Hamburg, Germany.

The Netherlands were the defending champions after the pair of Raymond van Barneveld and Co Stompé defeated Wales, represented by Mark Webster and Barrie Bates in the final on 5 December 2010.

England (represented by Phil Taylor and Adrian Lewis) won the tournament, beating Australia (represented by Simon Whitlock and Paul Nicholson) 4–3 in a sudden-death leg.

Format
24 countries in the PDC Order of Merit at the end of 4 January after the 2012 PDC World Darts Championship were represented at the PDC World Cup of Darts, with 19 from the 2010 edition to return, and the five others replaced by the Philippines, Malaysia, South Africa, Croatia and Hungary. Each nation's top ranked player was joined by the second highest player of that country. For seeding the average rankings of the players was used, with the top 8 nations automatically starting in round 2 and the other 16 nations starting in round 1.

The round 1 matches were shortened from best of 11 to best of 9 legs in doubles compared to 2010. The winners of round 1 played one of the top eight ranked teams in round 2, and it used the same format as the group stage in 2010, except that the sets were increased from best of 5 to best of 7 legs for singles and best of 9 legs for doubles matches. Two singles matches and a doubles match, with 1 point awarded for a singles win and 2 points awarded for a doubles win. If the match score was 2–2 at the end of the match, then a sudden-death doubles leg decided who got through. The fixtures remained the same, the top ranked player in the country faced the second highest ranked player in the country. Another change have seen the winners of round 2 qualify for the quarter-finals, which replaced the group stage. The quarter-finals used the same format as round 2, except that the doubles matches were best of 7 legs. The semi-finals and final used the same format used in 2010, except that the sets were reduced from best of 11 to best of 7 and from best of 15 to best of 13 respectively.

Prize money

Teams and seeding
Five teams made their debut in the 2012 World Cup. South Africa became the first African team to participate, they were joined by Croatia, Hungary, Malaysia and the Philippines. They replaced the Czech Republic, Poland, Russia, Slovakia and Slovenia.

Main draw
The bracket from the last 16 and the preliminary round matches were announced on 9 January 2012. The preliminary round teams were drawn against the seeded teams with pairings announced on 25 January 2012.

Results

Second round
The singles matches (which were best of 7 legs) took place in the evening session on 3 February, with the doubles matches (which were best of 9 legs) taking place in the afternoon session on 4 February.

Hogan & Petersen won the sudden death doubles leg to progress to the quarter-finals.

Taylor & Lewis won the sudden death doubles leg to progress to the quarter-finals.

Quarter-finals
All matches (which were best of 7 legs) took place in the evening session on 4 February.

Semi-finals
All matches (which were best of 7 legs) took place in the afternoon session on 5 February. Four points were needed to win the tie.

Final
All matches (which were best of 13 legs) took place in the evening session on 5 February. Four points were needed to win the title.

Television coverage
The tournament was broadcast by Sky Sports in the UK and Ireland, RTL 7 in the Netherlands, Fox Sports in Australia and OSN Showtime Network in the Middle East and North Africa.

References

External links
Official website

2012
PDC World Cup
PDC World Cup of Darts
Sports competitions in Hamburg